Polilactofate (PLF) is a copolymer of PDLL (poly(d,l-lactide)) and a phosphoester.

Copolymers